One of These Nights: Boston 1993 is an unofficial bootleg album by Don Henley, chronicling a recording of a 1993 Labor Day benefit concert at Foxborough Stadium, Boston. This concert is notable for featuring a guest appearance by Jimmy Buffett on tracks eight and ten. The album was released by Federalist Records Inc in 2000 (FRCD 2000-037). The runtime of the album clock in at 71 minutes and 36 seconds.

Track listing
Source:
 Hotel California
 One of These Nights
 Desperado
 The End of the Innocence
 Sunset Grill
 The Boys of Summer
 Life in the Fast Lane
 Volcano
 All She Wants to Do Is Dance
 Margaritaville
 Dirty Laundry
 Well, Well, Well
 The Heart of the Matter

References

2000 live albums
Don Henley albums